was a district located in Toyama Prefecture, Japan.

As of 2003, the district has an estimated population of 61,601 and a density of 159.56 persons per km2. The total area is 386.06 km2.

Towns and villages
Prior to its dissolution, the district had two towns and two villages:

 Fuchū
 Hosoiri
 Yamada
 Yatsuo

History

District Timeline
 On April 1, 2005 - The towns of Fuchū and Yatsuo, and the villages of Hosoiri and Yamada, along with the towns of Ōsawano and Ōyama (both from Kaminiikawa District), were merged into the expanded city of Toyama. Therefore, Nei District and Kaminiikawa District were both dissolved as the result of this merger.

See also
 List of dissolved districts of Japan

Former districts of Toyama Prefecture